Shewanella amazonensis is a facultative anaerobic bacterium from the genus of Shewanella which has been isolated from shallow water sediments from the Amazon River. The strain SB2B of Shewanella amazonensis produces hentriacontanonaene.

References

External links
Type strain of Shewanella amazonensis at BacDive -  the Bacterial Diversity Metadatabase

Alteromonadales
Bacteria described in 1998